Denis Vyacheslavovich Sergeev, in Europe alias Sergej Fedotov (born 1973 in Usharal, Kazakhstan) is a Russian officer of military intelligence service GRU. He is suspected to be the local coordinator of the poisoning of Sergei and Yulia Skripal 2018 in the UK and the 2015 poisoning of Bulgarian arms dealer Emilian Gebrev in Sofia.

Career
Denis Sergeev is a member of Russian military intelligence service GRU. Bellingcat wrote about his rank, that it "was at no lower than colonel, and possibly Lt. General or Major General."

Sergeev was born in 1973 in a military settlement in the Kazakh Soviet Socialist Republic and did his military service in the southern Russian port of Novorossiisk. Later he graduated from the Russian Diplomatic Military Academy in Moscow, also known as the "GRU Conservatory", where military intelligence trains its cadres.

Involvement in GRU operations in Europe
Sergeev was involved in the establishment of a total of eight companies between 2004 and 2012, were opened and later liquidated. He was shareholder or managing director; at times other suspected GRU officers were involved in the companies. The purpose of these companies, whose names imitate larger Russian companies, is unclear. NZZ speculated, that may have been used to launder money or as a fictitious employer to GRU employees. Sergeyev got a personal bank loan of about one million USD, about whose use nothing is known.

Involvement in the poisoning of Emil Gebrev 
One of the aliases of Sergeev, "Sergei Fedotov", was on a Russian passport used in Bulgaria at the time of the Novichok poisoning of Emil Gebrev, a Sofia arms dealer. The poisoning was acute.

The investigative website Bellingcat teamed up with investigative journalists at German daily Der Spiegel to report in November 2019 on a possible involvement in a poison attack on the Bulgarian arms manufacturer Emilian Gebrev in the spring of 2015. The Bulgarian Prosecutor General's Office has confirmed the presence of Sergeev during the period of the attack but the investigation was shuttered by July 2019 amid Gebrev's claims of cowardice.

Three individuals including Sergeev were charged in absentia by the Bulgarians with attempted murder "by intoxication with an unidentified phosphorus-organic substance" in January 2020. The substance used to poison the three Bulgarians may have been a banned pesticide called Amiton, known in Russia as Tetram. Curiously, there was as of January 2020 no record of written communication between officials in Bulgaria and the OPCW in this matter.

Involvement in the poisoning of Sergei and Yulia Skripal 
In February 2019, Bellingcat confirmed that a third Russian GRU officer was present in the United Kingdom when the Skripals' were poisoned by Novichok in March 2018. In September 2021, Bellingcat revealed Sergeev's identity and wrote that he was "a high-ranking GRU officer". Furthermore, Bellingcat established that "Russian authorities have taken the unusual measure of erasing any public records" of Sergeev's existence, as well as the other two main suspects in the Skripal posioning. 

Sergeev is said to had a senior position to the executing GRU-agents Chepiga and Mishkin in the Skripal poisoning operation. He was likely in charge of coordinating the operation in Salisbury.

References

External links
 Companies of Sergejew, NZZ 2/2019

GRU officers
Living people
1973 births